Presbyterian Reformed Church may refer to:
Presbyterian Reformed Church (Australia)
Presbyterian Reformed Church (North America)
Presbyterian Reformed Church in India
Presbyterian Reformed Church of Ecuador